Euphrictus spinosus is a tarantula (family Theraphosidae), subfamily Selenogyrinae, first described by A.S. Hirst in 1908. It is only known from the male, and from the Dja River, Cameroon.

Description 
Only the male is known. Euphrictus spinosus is distinguished by having 7–8 spines on the tibia of the first leg; having a yellowish carapace and a brown abdomen with long bright yellow hairs; and a long tapering embolus with a slight twist in the middle. Its body is 15.5 mm long and it has a stridulating organ between its chelicera. It also lacks a clypeus.

References 

Endemic fauna of Cameroon
Invertebrates of Cameroon
Theraphosidae
Spiders of Africa
Spiders described in 1908